Dunbar Hospital is a health facility in Ormlie Road, Thurso, Scotland. It is managed by NHS Highland.

History
The facility, which financed by a legacy from Mr Alexander Dunbar and designed in the Scottish baronial style, opened in 1885. After the hospital joined the National Health Service in 1948, additions included a new maternity wing in 1960 and a physiotherapy department in 1970. It was confirmed in July 2017 that, despite discharging its only inpatient, the hospital would remain open for business.

References

NHS Scotland hospitals
1885 establishments in Scotland
Hospitals established in 1885
Hospitals in Highland (council area)
Hospital buildings completed in 1885